The 1893 United States Senate election in Massachusetts was held during January 1893. Republican incumbent Henry L. Dawes chose not to seek a fourth term in office, and was replaced by Republican Congressman Henry Cabot Lodge.

At the time, Massachusetts elected United States senators by a majority vote of the combined houses of the Massachusetts General Court.

Background
In the 1892 state elections, Republicans won 186 of 280 seats in the legislature.

Nominating caucuses

Republican
The primary candidates for the nomination were Congressmen Henry Cabot Lodge and William W. Crapo.

On January 4, Republican legislators from both houses met to caucus and determine their nominee. Crapo supporters, led by State Senator William Morgan Butler, attempted to delay the caucus until January 12 but were unsuccessful. A motion to adjourn lost, with 124 votes against to 40 votes in favor. The caucus proceeded to a final ballot, with 94 votes needed for nomination. Lodge won easily.

Results

References

1893
Massachusetts
United States Senate